Rheda-Wiedenbrück (Westphalian: Raie-Wienbrügge) is a city in the district of Gütersloh, in North Rhine-Westphalia, Germany.

Geography
The twin community lies within the valley of the river Ems in the Westphalian Lowland south of the Teutoburg Forest, which is about 30 km away. The formerly independent towns of Rheda and Wiedenbrück are separated by the Federal Highway 2 which does not, however, form the historic border between the two districts. The Ems river runs through the city. The nearest major cities are Gütersloh (about 11 km), Bielefeld and Paderborn around 35 km away, and Hamm about 55 km away.
The river enters from the southeast into an urban area. Close to the public pool in Wiedenbrück, an artificial side arm branches off to the north of the river Ems. The Ems and the artificial branch are flowing around the old historic Wiedenbrück city centre and come together again behind the Ems lake at the height of the Wiedenbrück High School. The river then flows through the grounds of the State Garden Show 1988, connects the Wiedenbrücker center with the center of Rheda and leaves the urban area in the northernmost tip. Several small tributaries of the Ems are located in the municipality. Other notable waters are the Buxelssee northeast of the motorway, the Bänischsee northeast of Rheda and Lintel lake east of Wiedenbrück. One characteristic of the two combined cities is a green strip several kilometers long along the Ems, starting at Emssee in downtown Wiedenbrück and ending near the water castle in Rheda. The overall flat terrain falls from south to north. Outside the settlement areas, the city is dominated by agriculture and the city has comparatively large forest areas surrounding the city.

Expanse and utilisation of city area
The city, which is classified as a small center city municipality has an area of 86.68 km². The majority consists of agricultural and forest area, a combined 72%. The greatest distance from north to south is 12.6 km, from east to west about 14 km.

The length of the city border is 50,2 km, the highest elevation at 105m and the lowest point at 66m above mean sea level.

Neighbouring municipalities
 Oelde
 Herzebrock-Clarholz
 Gütersloh
 Rietberg
 Langenberg

Division and organisation
Rheda-Wiedenbrück is divided according to § 3 of the main articles of association in the city itself and the three villages Batenhorst, Lintel and St. Vit. Before 1 October 2004 the neighbourhood Nordrheda-Ems also was classified as a village, but was then merged with Rheda. The following table shows the numbers of inhabitants and areas of the towns and city areas as of 1 January 2013.

History

It is suspected that in 785 a first small church was built in Wiedenbrück. Excavations show the emergence of a transept basilica built after 900. The dendrochronological analysis of two tree coffins found north of the Saint Aegidius church resulted in a dating to the years 907/923 and 926/42. Rheda was documented at the latest in 1088 and earliest in 1085. Since its first mentioning in 1170 until 1807/1815, the castle or the later Rheda Castle was the center of the Rheda ruling region.
Wiedenbrück was the seat of the Office Reckenberg and thus an exclave of the Bishopric of Osnabrück.

Emperor Otto granted the rights of market, coin and customs law for Wiedenbrück to the bishop of Osnabrück in the year 952. Several certificates issued by Otto III (HRE) in Wiedenbrück in 985 are known. It is therefore assumed that a royal court existed in Wiedenbrück at that time.

In 1225 bishop Engelbert of Osnabrück took over the ancient legal court responsibility for Wiedenbrück and other cities. This is one of the starting points of the development of the Bishopric of Osnabrück to a territorial state of the Bishop of Osnabrück. The oldest surviving coins from Wiedenbrück are dated 1230. In 1231 Wiedenbrück was proclaimed civitas. Aldermen were elected to the Court and a seal was announced. In 1249 the new town was founded and a year later castle Reckenberg was mentioned for the first time.

Around 1462 a first constitution was drafted, based on the constitution of Osnabrück. In 1543 Wiedenbrück was reformed by Hermann Bonnus, a representative of the Bishop Franz of Waldeck. By 1565 Wiedenbrück was predominantly Lutheran. In the same year the boundaries between the Office Reckenberg to which Wiedenbrück counted, and the adjacent Rheda were established in the so-called Bielefeld recess, as two independent sovereign areas were first recognized.
After first steps for a Counter-Reformation were taken in 1624/1625, Wiedenbrück was occupied in 1626 during the Thirty Years' War by the Danes . When the Bishop Franz Wilhelm von Wartenberg assumed office in 1628, he continued the Counter-Reformation.
In 1637 Wiedenbrück established one of the oldest high schools in the region, the Gymnasium Marianum, a Latin School and forerunner of the current Ratsgymnasium high school in Wiedenbrück. The Franciscan monastery was founded in 1644 by Bishop Franz Wilhelm. Three years later, in July 1647 Wiedenbrück was taken by the Swedes, but cleared after dismantling of the fortress within two months. When in 1648 in Münster and Osnabrück the Peace of Westphalia was negotiated, this did require the alternation of a Catholic and a Lutheran bishop in the House of Brunswick-Lüneburg for the Bishopric of Osnabrück.
In 1664, prompted by Ernst August I., the refortification of the city began. In 1716 the last urban copper coins were minted. In 1726, a new office building was constructed on the Reckenberg.
As a result of the conversion of bishopric Osnabrück into a principality, Wiedenbrück was attached to the house of Hanover in 1802. In 1807 the city became part of the Kingdom of Westphalia. The chapter of fellows of collegiate  was disbanded in 1810, and the Office Reckenberg with Wiedenbrück were ceded to Prussia at the Congress of Vienna in 1816 and assigned to the new province of Westphalia. Wiedenbrück thus separated from the Diocese of Osnabrück, the Catholic communities of the former Office Reckenberg came to the Archdiocese of Paderborn.

In the early morning hours of 10 November 1938 members of the SA, who had previously gathered in the adjacent restaurant Neuhaus, set the Rheda synagogue on fire. The remains were demolished and the property subsequently sold. In 
1938 the federal highway A2 was opened to traffic. The highway was not, as is sometimes falsely claimed built almost exactly on the border between Rheda Wiedenbrück, but crosses it several times in different city areas.
In 1940, Field Marshal Hermann Goering ordered the confiscation of all bronze church bells, which were to be used for arms manufacturing. From 1816 until the local government reform in 1970, the city was the seat of the district named after the city of Wiedenbrück .

Religions
Of the 47,723 inhabitants (as of 1 January 2013), a total of 23,428 or about 49.1% are of Roman Catholic faith. Rheda-Wiedenbrück belongs to the Archdiocese of Paderborn. 10,274 inhabitants, or about 21.6% are Protestant faith. These believers are part of the church district of Gütersloh in the Evangelical Church of Westphalia. The remaining 10,802 inhabitants or 23.6%, have a different creed or religious affiliation. Because the district of Gütersloh is a stronghold of the Assyrian people living in Germany, the city has a relatively high share of members of the Syriac Orthodox Church.

Population history

The following overview shows the numbers of inhabitants of the city Rheda-Wiedenbrück and for 1939, 1950 and 1961 the number of inhabitants of the present-day city area. The figures up to 1970 and for 1987 are census results  and from 1975 based on official updates by the State Office for Data Processing and Statistics. The figures from 1975 to 1985 are estimated values, the figures from 1990 extrapolations based on the results of the census of 1987. The data refer to the resident population and from 1985 to the population with the main place of residence in the city.

Economy
The Tönnies Holding has its headquarters in Rheda-Wiedenbrück and operates the largest pork plant in Germany there.

Twin towns – sister cities

Rheda-Wiedenbrück is twinned with:
 Adjengré, Togo
 Aouda, Togo
 Oldenzaal, Netherlands
 Palamós, Spain

Notable people
Martin Harlinghausen (1902–1986), general
Liz Mohn (born 1941), businesswoman and philanthropist
Tim Krohn (born 1965), Swiss writer
Hanne Wolharn (born 1968), actress
Ingo Pohlmann (born 1972), pop musician
Nicole Kortlüke (born 1974), film editor
Tobias Böckers (born 1964), anatomist and neuroscientist
Markus Siegenhort, metal musician\

Associated with the town
Luise Hensel (1798–1876), poet, lived for more than 20 years in Wiedenbrück
Bernhard Hoetger (1874–1949), artist, lived in Wiedenbrück for a short time
Luigi Colani  (1928–2019), designer, lived temporarily in Rheda
Judith Lefeber (born 1981), singer, grew up in Rheda-Wiedenbrück

References

External links
 

Towns in North Rhine-Westphalia